Violetta Ruslanivna Sierova (born 24 February 2007) is a Ukrainian pair skater. With her skating partner, Ivan Khobta, she is the 2023 World Junior bronze medalist and a two-time silver medalist on the ISU Junior Grand Prix series (2022 JGP Poland I and 2022 JGP Poland II). Competing as seniors, they are the 2022 Ice Challenge bronze medalists and 2021 Ukrainian national champions.

Personal life 
Sierova was born on 24 February 2007 in Kyiv, Ukraine. She has an older brother.

Programs

With Khobta

Competitive highlights 
CS: Challenger Series; JGP: Junior Grand Prix

With Khobta

References

External links 
 

2007 births
Living people
Ukrainian female pair skaters
Sportspeople from Kyiv